Hi-Five is the debut album by the American R&B vocal group Hi-Five. Released on September 25, 1990, The album peaked at number thirty eight on the Billboard 200 albums chart. Driven by the hit singles "I Just Can't Handle It" (R&B #10), "I Like the Way (The Kissing Game)" (#1 R&B/Pop), "I Can't Wait Another Minute" (R&B #1, Pop #8) and "Just Another Girlfriend" (R&B #41), the album received an RIAA platinum certification. Also, Hi-Five is the only album to feature original Hi-Five member Toriano Easley, who was arrested for first-degree murder and manslaughter after the album was recorded but just before it was released. Easley is heard sharing lead vocals on "The Way You Said Goodbye", "Rag Doll", "I Can't Wait Another Minute", and "I Know Love". In the video for "I Can't Wait Another Minute", Easley's replacement Treston Irby lip-syncs Easley's part.

Background
The song, "Too Young" (in a single edit version), also appeared on the soundtrack to the 1991 John Singleton film Boyz n the Hood. It is the first recorded appearance of Mobb Deep rapper Prodigy who was 15 when this song was released, which he revealed in his book My Infamous Life: The Autobiography of Mobb Deep's Prodigy.

Track listing

Personnel

Hi-Five
Tony Thompson – lead vocals, harmony and backing vocals
Roderick Clark – harmony and backing vocals
Marcus Sanders – harmony and backing vocals
Toriano Easley – lead vocals, harmony and backing vocals
Russell Neal – harmony and backing vocals

Additional singers
Bernard Bell – backing vocals
Tim Cashion – backing vocals
Roiz Davis – backing vocals
Gordon Dukes – backing vocals
LaGaylia Frazier – backing vocals
Frederick Gordon – backing vocals
Dave Hollister – backing vocals
John James – backing vocals
Alvin Moody – backing vocals
Teddy Riley – backing vocals
Sean LaBreeze – backing vocals

Musicians
Carl Bourelly – keyboards, drum programming
William Walton – keyboards, drum programming
Jean-Paul Bourelly – guitars, keyboards
Fritz Cadet – guitar
Josh Grau – guitar
Frankie Smith – guitar
Patricia Halligan - guitar 
Vincent Henry – harmonica, saxophone
Kevin Johnson – keyboards, drums, percussion
Sean Richards – drum programming
Eric Foster White – keyboards, drum programming, trombone
DeVante Swing – mixing

Charts

References

External links

Production information at discogs

1990 debut albums
Hi-Five albums
Jive Records albums
Albums produced by Teddy Riley